The Church of the Nazarene is a Christian denomination that emerged in North America from the 19th-century Wesleyan-Holiness movement within Methodism. It is headquartered in Lenexa within Johnson County, Kansas. With its members commonly referred to as Nazarenes, it is the largest denomination in the world aligned with the Wesleyan-Holiness movement and is a member of the World Methodist Council.

Mission and vision
The global mission of the Church of the Nazarene since its beginnings has been "to respond to the Great Commission of Christ to 'go and make disciples of all nations' (Matthew 28:19)". In December 2006, this was expressed more precisely as "to make Christlike disciples in the nations". This frames the global mission of the denomination. In 2009 the General Assembly indicated in its revision of Article XI of the Manual the means for accomplishing its mission: "making disciples through evangelism, education, showing compassion, working for justice, and bearing witness to the kingdom of God." The mission of the Church of the Nazarene is to make Christlike disciples in the nations.

The denominational vision is: "to be a disciple-making church, an international community of faith, in the Wesleyan-Holiness tradition."

Core values 
Since 2001, the three "core values" of the Church have been identified as "Christian, Holiness, Missional". At the 2013 General Assembly, the Board of General Superintendents unveiled seven characteristics for the Church of the Nazarene:
 Meaningful Worship
 Theological Coherence
 Passionate Evangelism
 Intentional Discipleship
 Church Development
 Transformational Leadership
 Purposeful Compassion

The Board of General Superintendents affirmed: "While these descriptors do not take the place of our mission 'to make Christlike disciples in the nations' or our core values of 'Christian, holiness and missional,' they describe what we believe should characterize every Church of the Nazarene and in large part, should be reflected by Nazarenes everywhere."

Authorized by the General Assembly, "the supreme doctrine-formulating and lawmaking body of the Church of the Nazarene", the 2013–2017 edition of the Manual is declared "the official statement of the faith and practice of the church" and "is therefore authoritative as a guide for action". Reflecting the decisions and judgments of ministerial and lay delegates of the Twenty-eighth General Assembly, which met in Indianapolis June 23–27, 2013. The 2013–2017 Manual includes a brief historical statement of the denomination; its Constitution, which defines its 16 Articles of Faith, its understanding of the church, the Covenant of Christian Character for holy living, and principles of organization and government; the Covenant of Christian Conduct, which address key issues of contemporary society; and policies of church government dealing with the local, district, and general church organization.

Activities 
The Church of the Nazarene supports 52 undergraduate and graduate educational institutions in 35 countries on six continents around the world, with an enrollment of 51,555 students in 2016.

While for more than a century the denominational international headquarters was in Kansas City, Missouri, the Global Ministry Center (GMC) has been located at 17001 Prairie Star Parkway, Lenexa, Kansas, since September 15, 2008. The Foundry Publishing has been located in Kansas City, Missouri, since its inception in 1912.

Memberships and affiliations
 the Church of the Nazarene participated in:
 the Christian Holiness Partnership
 the Global Wesleyan Alliance
 the National Association of Evangelicals
 the World Methodist Council
 Mission Exchange (formerly the Evangelical Fellowship of Missions Agencies)
 the Evangelical Council for Financial Accountability,
 the Wesleyan Holiness Consortium
 the Wesleyan Holiness Study Project

Statistics
Based on "reporting received from districts for assemblies held 1 October 2015, through September 30, 2016", at the end of September 2016 the Church of the Nazarene had 2,471,553 total members (a net increase of 30,181 or 1.24% increase from the previous year). During that reporting period, 139,560 people became new members of the Church of the Nazarene, with 113,968 received by profession of faith and a further 25,592 coming from other denominations. With 626,811 members, the USA was the country with the greatest number of Nazarenes, with 25.36% of all Nazarenes members of US congregations. Other nations with large Nazarene populations include Mozambique (202,118), Brazil (153,002), India (136,079), Haiti (134,236), Bangladesh (123,192), Guatemala (90,101), Mexico (70,700), Peru (67,394), Benin (56,036), and Ethiopia (50,361). In 2016, the Church of the Nazarene had the highest percentage presence in the nations of Barbados (where its members constitute 2.84% of the population), Cape Verde (1.54% of the population), Eswatini (1.42% of the population), Haiti (1.34% of the population) Mozambique (0.82% of the population), and Samoa (0.66% of the population). The highest percentage of Nazarene presence in the US occurred in 2000, when there were 2.25 members for every 1,000 US people (0.25%). According to the Board of General Superintendents in December 2009, "an average of 455 people came to Christ and joined the Church of the Nazarene every day last year".

With 27.29% of the Nazarene population, for the first time Africa was the largest of the denomination's 6 global regions, with a total of 674,414 members reported (an increase of 27,370 members since 2015; and an increase of 355,072 since 2006). The USA/Canada region, which had always been the largest region in the denomination ranked as second with 25.87% of the global Nazarene population, with a total church membership of 639,410 (a decrease of 8,886 members from the previous year, and a decadal decline of 13,990). In 2006 the USA/Canada region comprised 40.27% of the Nazarene population. Since 2006 the Church has grown from 1,622,669 total members, which is a net increase of 848,884 members (or 52.31% decadal growth), with the most significant growth in the past decade being in the Eurasia (increase of 242.95%), Africa (increase of 111.19%), South America (up 82.46%), Mesoamerica (up 42.18%) and Asia-Pacific (23.00%) regions. In that period all of the net growth of the denomination took place outside of the US and Canada, with the US/Canada region the only region to have negative growth, with a net decadal loss of 2.14%.

According to Nazarene Research Services, from 1983 to 2013, Church of the Nazarene membership grew from 650,000 full members to more than 2 million. The top 10 world areas for net gain of full members over that 30-year period were: Mozambique (149,778), USA (130,712), Brazil (104,737), India (100,689), Haiti (74,262), Bangladesh (68,053), Guatemala (63,908), Ethiopia (48,304), Benin (45,700), and Peru (40,723).

In 2016, there were 22,392 organized churches (an increase of 480 from the previous year), and 8,182 churches that were not yet organized (an increase of 149 from the previous year) for a total of 30,574 local churches around the world (a net increase of 629 from the previous year).

During 2016 an average of 1,503,872 people attended worship services in the Church of the Nazarene around the world each week (an decrease of 5,390 people from the previous year). Since 2006 average worship attendance increased from 1,150,482 each week (an increase of 353,390 or 30.72% in the decade). Most of the growth came in the denomination's small (under 100 in attendance) or new churches.

During 2016, Nazarene churches received annual income from all sources of US$860,949,037, a decrease of US$941,336 from 2015, and a 3.79% decadal decrease from the US$894,866,142 reported in September 2006. Worldwide per capita expenses amounted to US$353.04 (a decrease of $198.77 from that reported in 2006).

History

The Church of the Nazarene is the product of a series of mergers that occurred between various holiness churches, associations and denominations throughout the 20th century. The most prominent of these mergers took place at the First and Second General Assemblies, held at Chicago, Illinois, and Pilot Point, Texas, in 1907 and 1908, respectively. The primary architect of these early mergers was C. W. Ruth.

First General Assembly
The First General Assembly held in Chicago, Illinois, from October 10–17, 1907, brought together the Eastern and the Western streams. The Western group was the Church of the Nazarene founded in October 1895 in Los Angeles, California, by Dr. Phineas F. Bresee, a minister in the Methodist Episcopal Church, and Dr Joseph Pomeroy Widney, a Methodist physician, and the second president of the University of Southern California. The Eastern group was the Association of Pentecostal Churches of America, a denomination formed on April 13, 1897, through the merger of two older bodies: The Central Evangelical Holiness Association (organized March 13–14, 1890) and led by Fred A. Hillery and C. Howard Davis; and three churches organized by William Howard Hoople since January 1894, and formed into the Association of Pentecostal Churches of America. On November 12, 1896, these two groups met in Brooklyn, agreed upon a plan of union, which included retaining the name and Manual of Hoople's group. Prominent leaders included Hiram F. Reynolds, Davis, and Hoople. At the time of its merger with the Church of the Nazarene in 1907, the APCA existed principally from Nova Scotia to Iowa and the northeastern United States. The name of the united body adopted at the First General Assembly was Pentecostal Church of the Nazarene, and Bresee and Reynolds were elected the first general superintendents.

Interim accessions
In April 1908 Bresee accepted Edgar P. Ellyson, president of the Holiness University of Texas of Peniel, Texas, his wife, Mary Emily Ellyson (1869–1943), and many leaders and members of the Holiness Association of Texas into the Pentecostal Church of the Nazarene, with Emily Ellyson elected pastor of the new congregation at Peniel. In September 1908 the Pennsylvania Conference of the Holiness Christian Church under the leadership of Horace G. Trumbauer merged with the Pentecostal Church of the Nazarene.

Second General Assembly
At the Second General Assembly held at Pilot Point, Texas, the Holiness Church of Christ (located in the southern United States) merged with the Pentecostal Nazarenes. The Holiness Church of Christ itself was the merger of the New Testament Church of Christ (founded in July 1894 at Milan, Tennessee, by R.L. Harris, but soon led by his widow Mary Lee Cagle), and a group (also called the Holiness Church of Christ), that resulted in November 1904 at Rising Star, Texas, from the prior merger of The Holiness Church (founded in 1888 in Texas) and the Independent Holiness Church (formed at Van Alstyne, Texas, in 1901, and led by Charles B. Jernigan and J.B. Chapman). The merger of the Holiness Church of Christ in the south and the Pentecostal Church of the Nazarene took place on Tuesday, October 13, 1908, at 10:40 am, "amid great shouts of joy and holy enthusiasm." The newly merged Church of the Nazarene began with 10,034 members, 228 congregations, 11 districts, and 19 missionaries, according to historical records. The latter date marks the "official" founding date. Bresee, Reynolds and Ellyson were elected general superintendents.

Later accessions
Other independent bodies joined at later dates, including the Pentecostal Church of Scotland (founded in 1909 by Rev. George Sharpe) and the Pentecostal Mission (founded in 1898 by J.O. McClurkan), both in 1915. At this point, the Church of the Nazarene now embraced seven previous denominations and significant parts of two other groups. In time, the Church of the Nazarene and the Wesleyan Church would emerge as the two major denominations to gather in the smaller bodies of the 19th century Wesleyan-holiness movement. In subsequent decades, there were new accessions and mergers. In the 1922, more than one thousand members and most of the workers led by Joseph G. Morrison, from the Laymen's Holiness Association (founded in 1917) located in the Dakotas, joined the Church of the Nazarene. In the 1950s, there were mergers with the Hephzibah Faith Missionary Association (founded in 1893 in Tabor, Iowa) in 1950; the International Holiness Mission (founded in London in 1907 by David Thomas) merged on October 29, 1952; the Calvary Holiness Church (founded in Britain 1934 by Maynard James and Jack Ford), united on June 11, 1955 (though there were clergy who dissented from this decision and continued as the Calvary Holiness Church); and the Gospel Workers Church of Canada (founded in Ontario in 1918) became part of the Church of the Nazarene on September 7, 1958. On April 3, 1988, an indigenous Church of the Nazarene in Nigeria, established in the 1940s, merged with the denomination.

The 2009 General Assembly authorized a committee with "the responsibility to approach "like-minded churches in the Wesleyan-Holiness tradition in order to pursue closer relations, with a goal of exploring the possibility of a merger or a collaborative relationship."

Separations
Throughout its history, there have been several groups that separated from the Church of the Nazarene to form new denominations. Among the new denominations formed by those seceding or being expelled from the Church of the Nazarene are: the People's Mission Church (1912), which had become part of the Church of the Nazarene in 1911, but subsequently became part of the Pilgrim Holiness Church in 1925; the Pentecost Pilgrim Church (1917), which merged with the International Holiness Union to form the Pilgrim Holiness Church in 1922; the Bible Missionary Church (1955), which subsequently split to create the Wesleyan Holiness Association of Churches (1959), and the Nazarene Baptist Church (1960) (later Nazarene Bible Church in 1967); the Holiness Church of the Nazarene (1961) in the Philippines; the Church of the Bible Covenant (1967); the Crusaders Churches of the United States of America (1972); and the Fellowship of Charismatic Nazarenes (1977).

International growth

Even before the merger of October 1908, the parental bodies of the Church of the Nazarene had a vision to be an international denomination. International expansion began in India in 1898 by missionaries sponsored by the Association of Pentecostal Churches of America. By 1908, there were churches in Canada and organized work in India, Eswatini, Cape Verde, and Japan, soon followed by work in central Africa, Mexico, and China. The 1915 mergers added congregations in the British Isles and work in Cuba, Central America, and South America. There were congregations in Syria and Palestine by 1922. General Superintendent Reynolds advocated "a mission to the world", and support for world evangelization became a distinguishing characteristic of Nazarene life. Taking advantage of new technologies, the church began producing the Showers of Blessing radio program in the 1940s, followed by the Spanish broadcast La Hora Nazarena and later by broadcasts in other languages. From the 1940s through the 1980s, indigenous holiness churches in other countries continued to join the church.

At the time of the 50th anniversary of the denomination in October 1958, a total of 19.8% of all Nazarenes lived outside the continental United States. In 1981 the figure was 28.3%. In late 1991 there were one million members of the denomination globally, with 43% living outside the US. By 2000 the church's membership was just under 1.4 million, with the church's membership outside the US doubling in the previous decade, and now comprising 53% of total global church membership. In June 2009 64 percent of Nazarene members and 80 percent of the church's then 429 districts were outside the United States. By September 2016 church membership outside USA had reached 1,844,742 or almost 75% of the total global church membership of 2,471,553, with 398 (84.5%) of the denomination's 471 districts located outside USA. In 2016 over 27% of Nazarenes were in the Africa region, and more than 20% Nazarenes spoke Spanish as their first language.

In 2017, the church was located in 162 "world areas" (approximately equivalent to nations). For a map illustrating both the world areas and regions of the Church of the Nazarene, see the Nazarene.org website. At the February 2012 annual meeting of the General Board, it was decided that the denomination would enter the following new nations: South Sudan (Africa Region), Turks and Caicos (Mesoamerica Region); and a tenth "Creative Access Area", thus increasing to 159 the world areas entered. At the February 2017 General Board meeting it was announced that the Church of the Nazarene is now in 162 world areas, adding Singapore, Mongolia, and Curaçao.

Each week Nazarenes worship in more than 212 languages or tribal languages, with literature produced in 90 of these. The Church of the Nazarene reaches out to persons around the globe through the Internet, radio broadcasts in 33 languages, and video and printed materials in 95 languages. In 2010, 286 books were produced in 59 languages for pastoral training and holiness, and World Mission Broadcast aired 140 radio broadcasts in 72 countries and 36 languages.

Internationalization

Developments (1907–1932)
The primary architect of Nazarene mission philosophy and practice was Hiram F. Reynolds, who had served as the foreign missionary superintendent in the Association of Pentecostal Churches of America (APCA) from its earliest years, and held a similar role in the Church of the Nazarene (under various titles) from 1907 until 1922. Influenced by the indigenous church mission theories of Anglican Henry Venn (1796–1873) and American Board of Commissioners for Foreign Missions secretary Rufus Anderson (1796–1880), from the beginning of the global expansion of the Church of the Nazarene (including its antecedent groups), there was a commitment to the development of indigenous churches and districts within the framework of a unitary global denomination under the authority of the Manual. As early as March 3, 1914, Nazarene mission policy developed for the work in Japan by Reynolds encouraged the creation of "self-supporting and self-governing churches":

When a Mission Church reaches a place where it can become entirely self supporting it shall be organized by the District Missionary Superintendent (SIC) Into a self supporting body according to the manual of the Pentecostal Church of the Nazarene adapted to the needs peculiar to the country, and shall be governed by the same. The church shall be granted a pastor whose duties and privileges (SIC) shall conform to the manual; and at this time all missionary control shall be relinquished except such superintendency as provided for in the manual.

Under the policy, foreign districts would be granted the same rights as US districts, with control passing from missionaries to local leaders. However, in 1919, all reference to the missionaries relinquishing control was removed, and the following substituted: "The pastor and delegates from the self-supporting church to the District Assembly must be able to enter into the deliberations of the Assembly in the English language until such time as a self-supporting district may be formed."

Developments (1922–1964)
Gailey indicates, that by 1932 these policy statements had been broadened to full "three-self" language, with the instruction to missionaries to cultivate among local Christians "self support, self leadership and responsibility for the propagation of the gospel in that field." The "language was unchanged for the next twenty years, and has remained essentially intact until the present time." By the 1930s, Nazarene missions leaders "did not aim toward the development of autonomous national churches, but a federation of districts. They did not plan for indefinite missionary control. Without a great deal of thought about where this would lead, without consciously copying any other denomination's model of church government, and without much theological reflection, the Church of the Nazarene became an international body." The first non-missionary district superintendents were George Sharpe (born in Scotland in 1865; died 1948) in Britain (November 1915) and Vicente G. Santin (1870–1948), appointed district superintendent in Mexico in 1919. In January 1936 the General Board divided the Japan District into two, and the Western or Kwansai district became the first regular district in the denomination, "with all the rights and privileges of any of the North American and British Isles districts subject to the Manual and the General Assembly", however the effects of World War II on the church in Japan saw the two districts reunified and revert to a missionary-led district.

Developments (1964–1980)
According to one denominational historian, W.T. Purkiser, the process of "internationalizing" the church began at the General Assembly in Portland, Oregon, in 1964 with an eight-year study of the church's total missionary program." Soon after that General Assembly, E.S. Phillips was elected Executive Secretary for World Missions, who encouraged the self-study. In this period, a think tank comprising R. Franklin Cook, a former missionary to India and member of the World Mission department since 1961; missiologist Paul Orjala, pioneer missionary to Haiti; and Honorato Reza, long-time representative for the Hispanic church, was formed to advise Phillips. They were responsible for developing the denomination's first "National Church Policy" that was adopted in 1966, and indicated explicitly for the first time the steps towards achieving "regular" district status. At the General Assembly of 1972, held at Miami Beach, Florida, Phillips, influenced by the recommendations of the preceding self-study, recommended in his report that "The administrative bodies of the church must be internationalized. ... That portion of the church that lives overseas ... must be given full voice in the councils of the church." Phillips advocated contextualization of the gospel and internationalization of denominational programs and structures. It was only in 1972 that the general secretary began to include overseas membership in reporting totals, as prior to this time it had been difficult to collect the needed data.

In 1973 Phillips died, and was succeeded by former missionary to Germany Jerald Johnson (born 1916). In 1974 the Guatemala Northeast district achieved regular status, the first since Japan achieved this milestone in 1936 Also in 1974 the Nazarene Young Peoples Society (now Nazarene Youth International) in its desire to be more inclusive, held its fifth International Institute (now Nazarene World Youth Conference) on the campus of European Nazarene Bible College in Büsingen, Germany, the first one held outside the United States. At the 1976 General Assembly held in Dallas, Texas, a Commission on Internationalization was created to recommend "means by which the next stage of internationalization might be implemented." In 1976, concrete steps were taken to make possible an international church with the creation of three intercontinental zones outside the US and Canada: Intercontinental Zone I (Europe, the Middle East and Africa); Intercontinental Zone II (the Orient and South Pacific); and Intercontinental Zone III (Central and South America). In 1977 the General Board had eight members (18%) from outside the US among its 44 members. In 1978 the first international district superintendents' conference was held in Kansas City, Missouri, with 52 leaders from 35 nations attending.

At the 1980 General Assembly held in Kansas City, the denomination formally committed itself to the process of internationalization, a deliberate policy of being one church of congregations and districts worldwide, rather than splitting into national churches like earlier Protestant denominations. The principle was set forth of "one church, one doctrine, one polity, and one policy." At that time, the entire denomination was divided into fifteen geographical regions, with eight in the US based around its regional college; one in Canada; and the three Intercontinental Zones subdivided into six regions: Africa; Asia; Europe and Middle East; Mexico, Central America, and Caribbean; South America; and the South Pacific. The General Board now included members from outside the US, Canada and the other parts of the British Commonwealth. In 1980 the General Board had fourteen (27%) out of its 51 members residing outside the United States and Canada.

Developments after 1980
After the election of Jerald Johnson as a general superintendent in June 1980, the General Board elected L. Guy Nees as his replacement. During his six years of leadership, Nees appointed directors for each of the six missions regions, who supervised the establishment of administrative offices in each region. The 2nd Commission on Internationalization recommended that regional directors should be born in the region, but this recommendation has never been implemented fully. The 1985 General Assembly allowed "cultural adaptations of local, district, and regional church government procedures", approved the creation of regional advisory councils and conferences, and national administrative boards. In 1989 the 3rd Commission recommended that the Church of the Nazarene should be a "denomination of districts (not nations)", and that districts and regions should follow geographical rather than racial or ethnic lines. The 1989 General Assembly stated three principles for internationalization: "(1) shared mission; (2) national identity; and (3) indigenization"; prohibited districts being constituted on the basis of ethnicity; explicitly rejected the idea of a commonwealth or federation of the denomination, in favour of it being a "global family"; and created a Commission on the International Church.

In 1999 incoming professor of missions at Nazarene Theological Seminary Mario Zani indicated that the biblical concept of koinonia, the fellowship "that transcended any differences, assignments, or titles", should be the basis of the development of the Church of the Nazarene. Zani critiqued the idea of internationalization as being too predetermined and focused on strategies and administrative policies, whereas he advocated the denominational goal should be globalization, which he defined as "that process by which we become sensitized and responsive to the multi-cultural, multi-lingual, multi-ethnic, and multi-national world of which we are a part." Zani concluded that though the Church of the Nazarene was "international from its conception, it was not truly global."

By the 2001 General Assembly, held in Indianapolis, 42 percent of delegates present and voting were not native English speakers. In 2011 68 percent of Nazarene members and 82 percent of the church's 439 districts are outside the United States. However, general secretary David Wilson reported that at the 2009 General Assembly that 562 delegates present and registered were from the US and Canada (55 percent) and 461 delegates were from other world regions (45 percent). As many elected delegates from outside the United States could not attend the General Assembly due to US immigration policies, financial or other reasons, the General Assembly authorised the creation of "a committee to address the concern that a high percentage (as many as 40 percent in some world regions) of non-North American/non-United States delegates are unable to attend a General Assembly". Since the Church of the Nazarene's quadrennial General Assembly is based on representation from districts from 162 world areas, the 2009 General Assembly was probably one of the most racially and linguistically diverse general meetings of any religious body that originated on American soil. At the 2009 General Assembly the delegates voted to create a global Manual that would be streamlined in comparison to recent Manuals, consist of the foreword, and Parts I, II, and III of the current Manual, and would also include parts of the Manual that are global in scope, retaining the universally appropriate polity and principles." The General Assembly authorised the different regions to adapt the Manual to fit specific cultural contexts and would function as a "regional Manual policy handbook."

For the quadrennium that started in July 2009, the General Board had 44 members representing the church's then 15 regions, and an additional four members who were elected to represent Education (2), Nazarene Youth International, and Nazarene Missions International. Of the 48 members elected, 27 (56%) were from outside the US, and 21 are US citizens. Five were women. The General Board elected at the 2013 General Assembly comprised 48 people, of whom 18 represented the US's then 8 regions, while 2 represented Canada, and 28 represented regions located outside of North America, with the additional 4 representing Education (2), Nazarene Youth International, and Nazarene Missions International. Five were women, including the NMI Global Vice President Lola Brickey of the USA.

Denominational name
The denomination inherited its current name from one of its primary antecedent groups, the Los Angeles, California, based Church of the Nazarene founded in October 1895 by Dr. Phineas F. Bresee and Dr. Joseph Pomeroy Widney. The name of the denomination comes from the biblical description of Jesus Christ, who had been raised in the village of Nazareth (and was regarded consequently as "a Nazarene").

Consequently, the denominational name focuses on Jesus as "The Nazarene". Additionally, the followers of Jesus were initially called "Nazarenes" (Acts 24:5), a term perhaps used by Jesus himself. According to Church of the Nazarene archivist Dr. Stan Ingersol:

The Hebrew name for "Jesus," derived from "Joshua," was common in first-century Palestinian Judaism, so "Jesus of Nazareth" specified which Jesus, and Acts references the early Palestinian Christians as followers "of the Nazarene" and "the sect of the Nazarenes." The term "Christian" developed outside Palestine, in Syria according to Acts, in conjunction with the mission to the Gentiles. It is derived from "Christos," a Greek translation of the Hebrew "messiah" or "anointed one." As Gentile Christianity spread through the Mediterranean basin, Jesus became known as Christ and references to "the Nazarene" diminished. Nineteenth and early 20th century European writers produced numerous biographies of Jesus, re-popularizing the term "Nazarene" and setting the stage for how the Church of the Nazarene received its name.

In 1895 the name of the denomination was first recommended by Dr. Joseph Pomeroy Widney, a former president of the University of Southern California and an influential figure in the early days of the Church of the Nazarene on the West Coast, where with Bresee, he was elected as a general superintendent for life. Ingersol indicates: "Other proposed names included various uses of 'Methodist'". Widney explained that the name had come to him one morning after spending the whole night in prayer. He said that the word "Nazarene" symbolized

the toiling, lowly mission of Christ. It was the name that Christ used of Himself, the name which was used in derision of Him by His enemies, the name which above all others linked Him to the great toiling, struggling, sorrowing heart of the world. It is Jesus, Jesus of Nazareth to whom the world in its misery and despair turns, that it may have hope

The denomination started as a church that ministered to the homeless and poor, and wanted to keep that attitude of ministering to "lower classes" of society.

At the First General Assembly that united Bresee's denomination with the Association of Pentecostal Churches of America in October 1907, the denominational name that emerged was the Pentecostal Church of the Nazarene, reflecting the ancestry of both denominational tributaries. A subsequent General Assembly (held in October 1908 at Pilot Point, Texas), which saw the merger with the Holiness Church of Christ, which was subsequently regarded as the natal date of the denomination, upheld the 1907 decision.

The term "Pentecostal" in the church's original name soon proved to be increasingly problematic. In the Wesleyan-holiness movement, the word was used widely as a synonym simply for "holiness". However, from the rise of 20th century Pentecostalism, especially after 1906, new meanings and associations attached themselves to the term – meanings that the Pentecostal Nazarenes rejected. Ingersol indicates: "[T]he word was increasingly understood in reference to charismatic gifts like speaking in tongues, which Nazarenes never practiced or approved."
At the fifth General Assembly (held in Nashville in 1919), in response to resolutions from thirty-five district assemblies, the General Assembly voted to remove the word "Pentecostal" from the church name, leaving it simply as "Church of the Nazarene". Consequently, since 1919 "the denominational name has been identical to that of its western parent-body — a name that originated because J. P. Widney read 'lives of Jesus' books, and his imagination had been captured by a strong personal vision of 'the Nazarene'."

Theology and doctrine
The Church of the Nazarene is a Methodist denomination that emerged during the holiness movement. The official doctrines of the Church of the Nazarene are published in the Manual: Church of the Nazarene, which is published quadrennially after the General Assembly, the primary convention and gathering of Nazarenes, at which leaders are elected, and amendments and suggestions are incorporated into the Manual. The Manual is published in print, and is available online at the Nazarene Church's website. Nazarenes have established 16 "Articles of Faith" as a guiding principle for living Christianity. The "Articles" include the following: one eternal self-existent God manifest in a Trinity; the divinity of Jesus and the Holy Spirit; the authority of the Bible; Original and Personal Sin; the work of atonement; prevenient grace; the need for repentance; justification, regeneration, and adoption; entire sanctification; the church; creedal baptism, "baptism being a symbol of the new covenant, young children may be baptized, upon request of parents or guardians who shall give assurance for them of necessary Christian training. Baptism may be administered by sprinkling, pouring, or immersion, according to the choice of the applicant" (Church of the Nazarene Manual 2013–2017); the Lord's Supper for all believers; divine healing; the return of Jesus Christ; and the resurrection of the dead.

While there is no official theology text authorised by the denomination, there are several that have been widely used in the pre-ordination training course for ministers. In the early years of the denomination, books by John Miley and William Burt Pope were used. The most influential theologians within the Church of the Nazarene have been Edgar P. Ellyson, author of Theological Compend (1908); A.M. Hills, author of Fundamental Christian Theology (1931); H. Orton Wiley, author of the three-volume Christian Theology (1940–1943); Mildred Bangs Wynkoop, author of A Theology of Love (1972) and Foundations of Wesleyan-Arminian Theology (1972); Richard S. Taylor, author of A Right Conception of Sin (1945) and Exploring Christian Holiness, Vol.3: The Theological Formulation (1985); H. Ray Dunning, author of Grace, Faith & Holiness (1988); and J. Kenneth Grider, author of A Wesleyan-Holiness Theology (1994). Contemporary Nazarene theologians include Craig Keen, Michael Lodahl, Thomas Oord, Samuel M. Powell, Bryan Stone, Rob Staples, and Thomas A. Noble. Noble has been commissioned to write a three-volume systematic theology for the denomination that seeks to be intellectually coherent, comprehensive, contemporary, and global.

Arminianism
The Church of the Nazarene stands in the Arminian tradition of free grace for all and human freedom to choose to partake of that saving grace. The Nazarene Church distinguishes itself from many other Protestant churches because of its belief that God's Holy Spirit empowers Christians to be constantly obedient to Him—similar to the belief of other churches in the Wesleyan-Holiness movement. The Nazarene Church does not believe that a Christian is helpless to sin every day. Rather, the Nazarene Church does teach that sin should be the rare exception in the life of a sanctified Christian. Also, there exists the belief in entire sanctification, the idea that a person can have a relationship of entire devotion to God in which they are no longer under the influence of original sin. This means that, through the power of the Holy Spirit, people can be changed so as to be able to live a holy life for the glory of God. The concept of entire sanctification (also called Christian perfection and Baptism with the Holy Ghost) stems from John Wesley's teaching. This is interpreted on a variety of different levels; as with any denomination, certain believers interpret the theology more rigidly and others less so.

Both the doctrines of entire sanctification and prevenient grace are usually interpreted in less rigid fashion by most church members, viewing spiritual perfection as something to strive toward, being already sanctified and forgiven for their sins under the sacrifice of Christ. Hence, thinking in a circular and very Greek fashion, one would be perfect, since one would be forgiven; however, since Christ was also human, and one is still entirely alive and living in the world, then one would still need to continue striving to live the best, or most "perfect" life possible, because Christ was God and man. And so, the dilemma continues in theological interpretation.

In recent years, Nazarene theologians have increasingly understood the movement's distinctive theological doctrine, entire sanctification, as best understood in terms of love. Love is the core notion of the various understandings of holiness and sanctification found in the Bible. Christians are called to love when in relation to God and others (Oord and Lodahl, 2005).

Distinctive Wesleyan emphases

The spiritual vision of early Nazarenes was derived from the doctrinal core of John Wesley's preaching and the holiness movement of the 19th century. The affirmations of the church include justification by grace through faith alone in Jesus Christ, sanctification by grace through faith united with good works, entire sanctification as an inheritance available to every Christian, and the witness of the Spirit to God's work in human lives. The holiness movement arose in the 1830s to promote these doctrines, especially Entire Sanctification, but splintered by 1900. The Church of the Nazarene remains committed to Christian holiness. The key emphasis of Wesley's theology relates to how Divine grace operates within the individual. Wesley defined the Way of Salvation as the operation of grace in at least three parts: Prevenient Grace, Justifying Grace, and Sanctifying Grace.

Prevenient grace, or the grace that "goes before" us, is given to all people. It is that power which enables us to love and motivates us to seek a relationship with God through Jesus Christ. This grace is the present work of God to turn us from our sin-corrupted human will to the loving will of the Father. In this work, God desires that we might sense both our sinfulness before God and God's offer of salvation. Prevenient grace allows those tainted by sin to nevertheless make a truly free choice to accept or reject God's salvation in Christ.

Justifying Grace or Accepting Grace is that grace, offered by God to all people, that we receive by faith and trust in Christ, through which God pardons the believer of sin. It is in justifying grace we are received by God, in spite of our sin. In this reception, we are forgiven through the atoning work of Jesus Christ on the cross. The justifying grace cancels our guilt and empowers us to resist the power of sin and to fully love God and neighbor. Today, justifying grace is also known as conversion, "accepting Jesus as your personal Lord and Savior", or being "born again". John Wesley originally called this experience the New Birth. This experience can occur in different ways; it can be one transforming moment, such as an altar call experience, or it may involve a series of decisions across a period of time.

Sanctifying Grace is that grace of God which sustains the believers in the journey toward Christian Perfection: a genuine love of God with heart, soul, mind, and strength, and a genuine love of our neighbors as ourselves. Sanctifying grace enables us to respond to God by leading a Spirit-filled and Christ-like life aimed toward love.

Wesleyan theology maintains that salvation is the act of God's grace entirely, from invitation, to pardon, to growth in holiness. Furthermore, God's prevenient, justifying, and sanctifying grace interact dynamically in the lives of Christians from birth to death.

For Wesley, good works were the fruit of one's salvation, not the way in which that salvation was earned. Faith and good works go hand in hand in Methodist theology: a living tree naturally and inevitably bears fruit. Wesleyan theology rejects the doctrine of eternal security, believing that salvation can be rejected (conditional security). Wesley emphasized that believers must continue to grow in their relationship with Christ, through the process of Sanctification.

A key outgrowth of this theology is the commitment of Nazarenes not only to the Evangelical Gospel of repentance and a personal relationship with God, but also to compassionate ministry to the poor.

Historical and contemporary issues
The Church of the Nazarene also takes a stance on a wide array of current moral and social issues, which is published in the Manual and online. These issues have included stances regarding human sexuality, theatrical arts, movies, social dancing, AIDS/HIV, and organ donation. On some matters, such as human sexuality, the church has said that homosexuality is a sin "subject to the wrath of God", and its stance on scientific discovery might be considered comparatively liberal.

Consistent with the position of classical Nazarene theologian H. Orton Wiley, several contemporary Nazarene theologians, including Thomas Jay Oord, Michael Lodahl, and Samuel M. Powell, have endeavored to reconcile the theory of evolution with theology. There are an increasing number of Nazarene scientists who support theistic evolution, among them Karl Giberson, Darrel R. Falk, and Richard G. Colling, whose 2004 book, Random Designer, has been controversial within the denomination since 2007. At the most recent General Assembly, held in Orlando, Florida, in July 2009, there was extended debate on a resolution to adopt a more fundamentalist view of the doctrine of Creation based on a more literal view of the Bible. This resolution was defeated resoundingly.

Throughout its history, the Church of the Nazarene has maintained a stance supporting total abstinence from alcohol and any other intoxicant, including cigarettes. Primary Nazarene founder Bresee was active in the Prohibition cause. Although this continues to be debated, the position remains in the church. While the church does not consider alcohol itself to be the cause of sin, it recognizes that intoxication and the like are a 'danger' to many people, both physically and spiritually. Historically, the Nazarene Church was founded in order to help the poor. Alcohol, gambling and the like, and their addictions, were cited as things that kept people poor. So in order to help the poor, as well as everyone else, Nazarenes have traditionally abstained from those things. Also, a person who is meant to serve an example to others should avoid the use of them, in order not to cause others to stray from their "walk with God", as that is considered a sin for both parties.

Worship and rituals

For many years Church of the Nazarene congregations had worship services (each lasting about an hour) three times a week: Sunday morning, Sunday evening, and Wednesday evening. The Sunday evening service was more evangelistically focused with gospel songs sung rather than hymns, testimonies given, and often concluded with an altar call inviting those seeking either salvation or entire sanctification to come forward and kneel at the altar. However, increasingly in recent years, the Sunday and Wednesday evening services in many Nazarene churches have changed from worship services to discipleship training, and many growing churches have utilized weekly small group meetings. Worship services typically contain singing a mix of hymns and contemporary worship songs, prayer, special music, reading of Scripture, sermon, and offering. Services are often focused toward a time of prayer and commitment at the end of the sermon, with people finding spiritual help as they gather for corporate praying.

Worship styles vary widely. Over the last twenty years, an increasing number of Nazarene churches have utilized contemporary worship services as their predominant worship style. This may involve the use of a projector to display song and chorus lyrics onto a video screen. More traditional Nazarene churches may have a song leader who directs congregational hymns from the pulpit or platform. In some worship services, particularly the traditional Wednesday night prayer meeting, members are often encouraged to "testify", that is, give an account of some aspect of their spiritual journey. A testimony may describe a personal encounter with the Holy Spirit or speak to a particular event of meaning in a person's recent Christian life. Prayers offered during services are most often communal and led by a single person. More recently, a small number of local churches have adopted a more formal liturgical style based on practices in the Anglican tradition.

Annual revival meetings have long been a traditional part of Nazarene life, and are still encouraged in the Manual, though may be seen less today than they once were. An evangelist comes to preach the revival services. The Church of the Nazarene licenses and credentials evangelists, many of whom earn their entire living through their ministry of evangelism. Most Nazarene districts also sponsor an annual camp meeting for adults and their families as well as separate camps for both teens and children.

A distinct approach to worship, especially in the early days of the Nazarene church, was the belief that ultimately the Holy Spirit should lead the worship. Services that were considered to be palpably evidenced by leadership of the Holy Spirit were marked by what was called "the Glory". Almost equal to the emphasis on the doctrine of entire sanctification was the emphasis on these unusual worship experiences. Church leaders were careful to avoid emotional techniques to bring about such services. Ritual and the usual order of services were not abandoned but were held loosely. While some of the services were marked by shouting, others were marked by testimony, weeping, and individuals seeking spiritual help.

While Nazarenes believe that the ill should utilize all appropriate medical agencies, Nazarenes also affirm God's will of divine healing and pastors may "lay hands" upon the ill in prayer, either at the hospital or in a worship service. A prayer for divine healing is never understood as excluding medical services and agencies.

Sacraments
The Church of the Nazarene recognizes two sacraments: Christian baptism and the Lord's Supper, or communion.

The 2017–2021 Manual included a significantly revised Article XIII on The Lord's Supper:

Nazarenes permit both believer's baptism and infant baptism. When a family in the Church of the Nazarene chooses not to baptize their infants they often participate in an infant dedication. Whether a child is baptized or dedicated is the choice of the parents of the child. This decision is often based on geographic location, local church culture, and their pastor's theological leanings, and if they were baptized or dedicated as a child.

The Nazarene Manual includes rituals for the believer's baptism, infant baptism, infant dedication, reception of new church members, communion, weddings, funerals, the organization of a local church, the installation of new officers, and church dedications.

Polity and leadership
The Church of the Nazarene combines episcopal and congregational polities to form a "representative" government. The salient feature of this structure is shared power between people and clergy as well as between the local church and the denomination. At the 1923 General Assembly, the following was stated in relation to the denomination's polity: "Our people have felt they did not want extreme
episcopacy in the appointment of pastors, neither did they want extreme congregationalism. In the past, we have tried to find a middle ground, so as to respect the spirit of democracy and at the same time retain a degree of efficiency."

General Assembly

According to the denominational website, "The General Assembly of the church serves as the supreme doctrine-formulating, lawmaking, and elective authority of the Church of the Nazarene, subject to the provisions of the church constitution." Composed of elected representatives from all of the denomination's districts globally, since 1985 the General Assembly has met once every four years. All General Assemblies have been held in the United States. At the General Assembly held in Orlando, Florida, US, in June 2009, a total of 1,030 delegates were finally registered, with 982 eligible to vote, and 48 non-voting delegates. The General Assembly elects the members of the Board of General Superintendents and considers legislative proposals from the church's 465 districts. Topics under consideration may range from the method of calling a pastor to bioethics.

Board of General Superintendents

The highest elected office in the Church of the Nazarene is that of General Superintendent. Every four years six ordained elders, who are at least 35 years old and are not over 68 years old, are elected by the General Assembly of the Church of the Nazarene for a four-year term. Both ordained females and males are eligible to be elected to the office of General Superintendent. However of the forty-one persons who have served in this office, only two women have been elected: Dr. Nina G. Gunter (born 1940), who served for four years from 2005, and Dr. Carla Sunberg (born 1961), who was elected in 2017 and is currently serving. The youngest person elected General Superintendent was Roy T. Williams (1883–1946), who was only 32 when chosen to fill a vacancy caused by the deaths of Phineas F. Bresee (1837–1915) and William C. Wilson (1866–1915), both of whom died within weeks of the 1915 General Assembly. Wilson is the shortest-serving General Superintendent, dying only 33 days after his election at the age of 47. R.T. Williams was the longest-serving general superintendent, who served for just over 30 years from January 1916 to his death in March 1946. Eight of the first eleven General Superintendents died in office, resulting in both the expansion in the number of general superintendents, and an upper age limit of 72. Dr Hiram F. Reynolds (1854–1938), one of the original two General Superintendents elected in October 1907, holds the record as the oldest person to serve in this office, retiring in 1932, at the age of 78.

Collectively these six elders constitute the Board of General Superintendents, which is, according to the denominational website, "charged with the responsibility of administering the worldwide work of the Church of the Nazarene. The Board of General Superintendents also interprets the denomination's book of polity, the Manual of the Church of the Nazarene." All official acts of the Board of General Superintendents are subject to the review of the General Assembly, the supreme legislative body in the denomination. At the 2013 General Assembly, General Superintendents Jerry D. Porter (born 1949), elected initially in 1997 in San Antonio, Texas, was re-elected to a fifth term; J. K. Warrick (born 1945), who was elected initially in 2005 in Indianapolis, Indiana, was re-elected to a third four-year term; Eugenio Duarte, from Cape Verde, the 37th general superintendent, the first person elected to the Board of General Superintendents from Africa, was re-elected to a 2nd term; and David W. Graves, the 38th general superintendent, was re-elected to a 2nd term. After the mandatory retirement of Jesse C. Middendorf (born 1942); and the resignation of Stan Toler, the 39th general superintendent, David Busic, President of Nazarene Theological Seminary since 2011, and Gustavo A. Crocker, director of the Eurasia region since 2004, were elected as the 40th and 41st General Superintendents respectively. Crocker, a native of San Jerónimo, Guatemala, the first General Superintendent from Central America, and the 2nd general superintendent elected while residing outside the US/Canada Region, was elected on a record 53rd ballot. In December 2013, Porter and Warrick, who is term limited, announced that they would will retire at the 29th General Assembly in June 2017.
At the 2017 General Assembly, Filimão M. Chambo was elected as the 42nd General Superintendent. Chambo, a native of Mozambique, was serving as director of the Africa Region at the time of his election. Carla Sunberg was elected as the 43rd General Superintendent. She was serving as president of Nazarene Theological Seminary at the time.

General Board
The General Board of the Church of the Nazarene was created by action of the 1923 General Assembly to replace a system of independent general boards that often competed with one another for the church dollar. These independent boards became departments of the General Board. The General Board is made up of district superintendents, pastors and lay leaders representing the global church and elected by the regional caucuses at General Assembly. Convening in late February each year, the board has governing responsibility for the international Church of the Nazarene between general assemblies. The General Board carries out the corporate business of the denomination.

At the June 2013 General Assembly a new General Board was elected to a four-year term. The General Board currently has 48 members representing the church's then 15 regions, and an additional four members were elected to represent Education (2), Nazarene Youth International, and Nazarene Missions International. Of the 52 members elected, 27 are from outside the US, and 25 are US citizens. Six are women. Meeting at least annually, the most recent meeting of the General Board was its 92nd Session held February 24–26, 2015 in Lenexa, Kansas. At that meeting, The General Board members represented the following world areas: Papua New Guinea, Uruguay, Trinidad and Tobago, Bangladesh, US, Dominican Republic, Venezuela, India, Canada, El Salvador, Philippines, Netherlands, Brazil, Germany, Mozambique, South Africa, Fiji, Guyana, South Korea, United Kingdom, and Eswatini.

Ministers
The Church of the Nazarene has two orders of ordained ministry: the ordained elder and the ordained deacon. The ordained elder is a person, either male or female, who has been set apart for a ministry of "Word and Sacrament". Their primary assignment is to preach the Word, administer the sacraments, and lead the local church. The ordained deacon is a man or woman who has been set apart for full-time ministry in a role other than "Word and Sacrament". Those eligible to be ordained as deacons include those who are called to a full-time ministry of music, Christian social ministry, or director of Christian education, or another ministry that does not typically involve leading a congregation. The church also has district licensed ministers. Usually these are persons who are on the path toward ordination or who are strongly considering a call to ordained ministry. A licensed minister may, in some cases, be the pastor of a church.

The Church of the Nazarene also recognizes these specialized forms of Christian service and ministry. In September 2014, the Church of the Nazarene had 17,017 ordained elders, 838 ordained deacons and 9,847 licensed ministers, for a total of 27,702 credentialed or licensed ministers. On March 24, 2010, the Bangladesh District set a denominational record with 193 women and men ordained in one service, including 30 women, the most ever in the denomination's history, exceeding the 39 ordained in Peru.

Organization

Local church
The basic unit of organization in the Church of the Nazarene is the local church congregation, which may be either an organized church or church-type mission (often known as "New Starts"). At the end of September 2014, there were 21,425 organized churches and a further 7,970 church-type missions, for a total of 29,395 congregations. The average Nazarene congregation globally has 78 members, and an average weekly worship attendance of 51. The largest congregation in the denomination as measured by average weekly attendance each Sunday morning (as of February 2009) was the Central De Campinas church on the Paulista Sudeste district in Brazil, which reported 8,216 members and an average weekly Sunday morning worship attendance of 7,237. During 2009 it received 873 new Nazarenes. The next four largest congregations were the Casa De Oracion Paso Ancho church in Colombia (4,600 members; 7,000 worship); the Americana church in Brazil; Grove City Church of the Nazarene in Grove City, Ohio; and College Church of the Nazarene in Olathe, Kansas.

District
Local congregations are grouped administratively into geographical districts. At the 2009 General Assembly a resolution was passed defining a district as "an entity made up of interdependent local churches organized to facilitate the mission of each local church through mutual support, and sharing of resources, and collaboration". Each district is led by a district superintendent, who is usually elected by delegates from each local church in an annual meeting called the District Assembly. In embryonic districts, the district superintendent may be appointed by the jurisdictional general superintendent. There are currently 465 districts worldwide. In 2008 these were 174 are Phase 3 (regular districts); 85 are Phase 2; and 141 are Phase 1. There were also 33 pioneer areas. There are 80 Districts in the US and Canada. The largest districts are Brazil Sudeste Paulista (24,686 full members), South Korea National District (23,143 members), India East (19,490 members), and Oklahoma (17,530), the largest district in the US.

Districts may also be divided into several Zones or missional networks, where local churches within a Zone may cooperate for various activities, particularly for youth events.

Region
All Districts of the Church of the Nazarene are organized into Regions. Previously there were 15 regions, but from February 28, 2011, there were 6 Regions. At September 30, 2014, there were:
 Africa (611,398 members), in 8,686 churches in 130 districts in 6 fields in 42 world areas;
 Asia-Pacific (119,349 members in 1,894 churches in 46 districts in 7 fields in 29 world areas);
 Eurasia (240,585 members in 7,832 churches in 52 districts in 7 fields in 36 world areas);
 MesoAmerica (which combines the former Caribbean and Mexico & Central America regions) (364,368 members in 3,133 churches in 77 districts in 5 fields in 31 world areas);
 South America (279,408 members in 2,603 churches in 80 districts in 8 fields in 10 world areas);
 USA/Canada, which comprises the US, Canada, and Bermuda, has 649,998 members in 5,247 churches in 80 districts in 9 zones in 3 world areas, and has 11 Nazarene universities and colleges, and also Nazarene Theological Seminary in Kansas City, Missouri.

The regions are administered through Nazarene Global Mission, an entity formed in 2011 after a strategic restructuring that incorporates all functions of the former World Mission Department. It focuses on partnership and collaboration to help equip Nazarene churches support mission at community, district, regional and international levels. The Global Mission Director is Dr. Verne Ward III, who was at the time of his election in March 2012, Director of the Asia-Pacific Region. Each region has a regional director.

In the United States and Canada, there are educational zones centered on one of the denominational institutions of higher education. Each local church pays an agreed budget to the District level, and each District remits a portion of the local and district budgets for their zone's Nazarene institution of higher education (see "Higher Education" below). Educational zones for the Church of the Nazarene were first established in 1918.

Field
Districts in areas administered by the Global Mission are often grouped into "fields", with a field strategy co-ordinator providing strategic leadership. In the US and Canada the sub-regional areas may be referred to as "Zones". On January 31, 2008, India became the first field in the global Church of the Nazarene to be entirely indigenous with the field strategy co-ordinator, Rev Sunil Dange, and all 15 district superintendents, all ministry coordinators, and all pastors from India.

Higher education

The 2013–2017 Manual of the Church of the Nazarene states that "[t]he Church of the Nazarene, from its inception, has been committed to higher education. The church provides the college/university with students, administrative and faculty leadership, and financial and spiritual support ... The church college/university, while not a local congregation, is an integral part of the church; it is an expression of the church." A portion of each local church and district budget is allocated for Nazarene higher education, which subsidizes the cost of each educational zone or nation's respective institution. Globally the denomination contributed US$23,904,271 in 2010 (a decrease of US$1,865,713 from 2009) to Nazarene educational institutions. Hence, in the United States and Canada, there is one Nazarene liberal arts college per Region. The regional colleges are Canada Region for Ambrose University in Calgary, Alberta, Eastern USA Region for Eastern Nazarene College (ENC) in Quincy, Massachusetts, North Central USA Region for MidAmerica Nazarene University (MNU) in Olathe, Kansas, East Central USA Region for Mount Vernon Nazarene University (MVNU) in Mount Vernon, Ohio, Northwest USA Region for Northwest Nazarene University (NNU) in Nampa, Idaho, Central USA Region for Olivet Nazarene University (ONU) in Bourbonnais, Illinois, Southwest USA Region for Point Loma Nazarene University (PLNU) in San Diego, California, South Central USA Region for Southern Nazarene University (SNU) in Bethany, Oklahoma, Southeast USA Region for Trevecca Nazarene University (TNU) in Nashville, Tennessee. Accompanying that logic of institutional support, there is a gentlemen's agreement between the Nazarene liberal arts colleges in the United States to not actively recruit outside their respective educational zone, requiring that a Nazarene prospective college student must first seek information from any "Off-Region" institution on an individual basis.

In 2016, the Church of the Nazarene owned and operated 52 educational institutions in 35 countries on six continents, comprising 5 graduate seminaries; 31 undergraduate Bible/theological colleges; 2 nurses training colleges in Eswatini and Papua New Guinea, and 1 teacher training college in Papua New Guinea, that had a 2016 combined enrollment of 51,555 students globally. In these Nazarene institutions of higher education in 2011 there were 30,936 students enrolled in on-campus programs (a decrease of 221 from the previous year) and 18,612 students enrolled in extension programs (an increase of 3,802 over last year). At the end of 2010 these educational assets were valued at US$1,041,436,984 (an increase of US$54.9 million over 2009), with liabilities of US$341,009,574, for a net worth of US$700,427,410. During the 2010–2011 academic year, 11,015 degrees or diplomas were awarded by Nazarene institutions worldwide, an increase of 1,691 over the previous year.

In 2016, the largest Nazarene educational institution was Korea Nazarene University, with 5,208 students, followed by Olivet Nazarene University in Bourbonnais, Illinois (4,670 students), Africa Nazarene University in Nairobi, Kenya (3,872 students), Point Loma Nazarene University in San Diego, California (3,806 students), and Trevecca Nazarene University in Nashville, Tennessee (3,093 students).

On October 16, 2009, the Global Consortium of Nazarene Graduate Seminaries and Schools of Theology (GCNGSST) was inaugurated in Manchester, England. It comprised the following eight institutions: Africa Nazarene University (Ongata Rongai, Kenya); Asia-Pacific Nazarene Theological Seminary (Taytay, Rizal, Philippines); Brazil Nazarene College (Faculdade Nazarena do Brasil) (Campinas, Brazil); Korea Nazarene University (Cheonan, South Korea); Nazarene Theological College, (Brisbane, Australia); Nazarene Theological College, (Manchester, England); Nazarene Theological Seminary (Kansas City, Missouri); and Seminario Nazareno de las Americas (SENDAS) (San José, Costa Rica). Nazarene educational institutions are overseen by the Nazarene International Board of Education (IBOE). Funded through a grant from the Henry Luce Foundation, the consortium connects Nazarene seminaries by optimizing the global resources available for theological education. While much of the work of the consortium is done throughout the year via video conferencing, subsequent meetings of the presidents and academic deans of the member institutions were held on the campuses of Korean Nazarene University in October 2010, and Nazarene Theological Seminary in August 2012.

Ministries
There are several key ministries that focus on different aspect of the larger mission statement. The biggest of these are Nazarene Youth International (NYI), Sunday School and Discipleship Ministries, Nazarene Missions International (NMI), and Nazarene Publishing House (NPH).

Nazarene Youth International (NYI)
Nazarene Youth International is a youth organisation that has partnered with the Church of the Nazarene since its inception as the Nazarene Young Peoples Society (NYPS) in 1923. In 1976 it adopted its current name, and focused on young people aged 12 to 23 (later 12 to 29). In September 2014 NYI membership globally was 422,012 young people aged 14–25 (a decrease of 8,871 from 2013, but an increase of 85,062 or 25.24% since 2004) in 16,597 local organizations.

The NYI-sponsored Third Wave emerging leadership conference was held from January 3–8, 2012 in Bangkok, Thailand, with approximately 250 participants from 55 countries attending.

Sunday School and Discipleship Ministries International (SDMI)
At the end of 2010, Sunday School and Discipleship Ministries International (SDMI) reported an average global Sunday School weekly attendance of 703,344, and the Global Discipleship Group attendance was 191,912, for a total of 895,256 (an increase of 52,132 from 2009). The Total Global Responsibility List was 1,690,255 in 2009.
In 2016, the Global Discipleship attendance was 1,245,818; a decadal growth rate of 55%. The total global responsibility lists was 1,845,786.

Missions
The Church of the Nazarene has been committed to obeying the Great Commission since its inception. According to the 2013–2017 Manual, "Historically, Nazarene global ministry has centered around evangelism, compassionate ministry, and education." In 2014 the denomination had a total of 702 salaried (funded by the World Evangelism Fund for the Church of the Nazarene) in 40 world areas, of whom, forty percent of General Board missionaries were non-U.S. missionaries. Additionally, there were contracted volunteers serving as missionaries in 40 world areas. In 2013, 687 missionaries and 231 missionary kids were deployed from 27 world areas (including 313 Mission Corps volunteers). In 2014 Nazarene missionaries originated from 35 different world areas. 10,824 volunteers participated in mission in 2013. In addition to Mission Corps, there were 292 individual volunteers, and 10,219 Work & Witness team members. In 2010, 92 Youth in Mission participants served in 14 world areas, including 52 participants from outside the US/Canada Regions.

Nazarene Missions International (NMI)
Nazarene Missions International (NMI) was founded in 1915 at the fourth General Assembly, as the Nazarene Foreign Missionary Society, with Susan Norris Fitkin, wife of financier Abram Fitkin, elected the first president. Fitkin remained in office until June 1948. NMI is "the church-relations heart of World Mission within each local church", and "the local-church-based global mobilization and promotional arm of the Church of the Nazarene". has 916,470 members. The purpose of NMI is to mobilize churches in mission through praying, discipling, giving, and educating.

From a peak of $54 million given for the World Evangelism Fund (WEF) in 2002, as a consequence of the Late-2000s financial crisis, the total amount raised for the World Evangelism Fund in 2012 was approximately US$38.3 million (a decrease of $0.5 million from the previous year). However, Mission Specials receipted were an additional US$26.1 million, a decrease of US$5.3 million from the previous year. This combined giving totaled US$64.4 million, a decrease of $5.8 million. Despite its membership being less than 33% of the denominational total, the USA regions contributed 94% of WEF funding, and 90% of Approved Specials. During 2012, 27.7% of Nazarene congregations gave the recommended 5.5% of total income to the WEF, an additional 37.5% of congregations made some contribution to the WEF, while 35% of congregations made no contribution.

JESUS Film Harvest Partners
The Church of the Nazarene is an active participant in the Jesus Film Project, organizing teams to show the Jesus film. In 2014 Global Mission (GM) and JESUS Film Harvest Partners (JFHP) has 619 JESUS Film teams working with missionaries and local leaders, spreading the gospel in 290 languages and in 135 world areas. The cumulative total from 1998 to June 2014 is 67,280,854 evangelistic contacts with a reported 12,640,017 decisions made for Christ (18.8 percent of contacts) and 5,261,310 (41.6 percent of decisions) initial discipleship follow-ups. Since 1998, 43,481 new preaching points were started. The most current information is available on the jfhp.org website.

Work and Witness
Since its inception in 1974, Work and Witness, an endeavor that sends teams of volunteers into cross-cultural situations primarily to construct buildings on the mission field, has 196,060 participants who have given 13,246,196 labor hours, which equals 6,564 years of labor. In 2010, there were 537 Work & Witness teams with a total of 8,955 participants. In 2008 teams served in 72 world areas.

Nazarene Compassionate Ministries
The Church of the Nazarene has 245 full-time compassionate ministries centers and volunteer efforts around the world. Nazarenes have been instrumental in assisting people in every part of the globe who have been affected by war, famine, hurricane, flood, and other natural and human-made disasters. In 2008, Nazarene Compassionate Ministries' Child Development program had 123 Child Development Centers globally that provided more than 11,140 sponsorships in 77 countries, and met the needs of more than 50,000 children through nutritional programs. The church operates 64 medical clinics and hospitals worldwide. In 2010, 11,874 children were fed each week through Nazarene Compassionate Ministries.

Nazarene Publishing House (NPH)
Nazarene Publishing House (NPH), the publishing arm of the Church of the Nazarene, is the largest publisher of Wesleyan-Holiness literature in the world. NPH prints more than 25 million pieces of literature each year. NPH processes more than 250,000 orders each year from more than 11,000 churches.

The Third General Assembly of the Church of the Nazarene held in Nashville, Tennessee, in 1911 recommended that the infant denomination's three publishing companies (then located in Rhode Island, Texas, and Los Angeles, California) each founded by a different Nazarene parent body, consolidate into "one central publishing company" and merge their three papers into one strong paper. The newly created Pentecostal Nazarene Publishing House was sited at 2923 Troost Avenue, Kansas City, Missouri, in 1912, with Clarence J. Kinne, a Nazarene ordained minister, as its first manager. The Herald of Holiness, the new weekly paper, edited by B. F. Haynes, appeared for the first time on Wednesday, April 17, 1912. The Other Sheep (later World Mission) magazine began publication in 1913 under founding editor Charles Allen McConnell, who was NPH manager from 1916 to 1918. Both magazines were published until 1999, when they were discontinued in favor of Holiness Today, a new publication. In the meantime, Spanish, Portuguese, and French editions of Herald of Holiness appeared over the years.

NPH is a separate corporate entity from General Church of the Nazarene, although it is accountable to the church. NPH has a board of directors and is also accountable to one of the six General Superintendents of the Church of the Nazarene who has oversight of NPH. NPH publishes a variety of books, music and materials. The primary label under which books are published is Beacon Hill Press. Sunday school curriculum is published under the label Word Action. Youth ministry resources are published under the label Barefoot Ministries. Spanish materials are produced by Casa Nazarena de Publicaciones.

Music and drama resources are published under the label Lillenas Publishing, which was founded in Indianapolis, Indiana, in 1925 by Nazarene minister and composer Haldor Lillenas (born November 19, 1885, at Stord Island, Norway; died August 18, 1959, at Aspen, Colorado), and subsequently purchased by NPH in 1930.

Notable Nazarenes
The following are notable people who have past or current affiliation or membership in the Church of the Nazarene.

Current Nazarenes
 South African politician Rev. William Bantom (born ), the first black mayor of Cape Town (1995–2000), was a minister in the Church of the Nazarene since 1968;
 Historical fiction author Donna Fletcher Crow (born November 15, 1941), author of Glastonbury, a graduate of Northwest Nazarene University, is a member of the Church of the Nazarene;
 American psychologist Dr. James Dobson (born April 21, 1936), founder of Focus on the Family, a fourth-generation Nazarene, a graduate of Nazarene school Pasadena College, who does not "advertise his Nazarene identity"; is a member of the Eastborough Church of the Nazarene in Colorado Springs, Colorado;
 USAID Acting Administrator Dr. Kent R. Hill, a graduate of Northwest Nazarene University, and former president of Eastern Nazarene College (1992–2001), is an active member;
 Dove Award-winning Gospel singer Crystal Lewis (born September 11, 1969), the granddaughter of Nazarene ministers, the daughter of Mary and Dr. Holland Lewis (an ordained elder in the Church of the Nazarene, and the former general president of Nazarene Youth International), began singing in her father's churches;
 Mexican politician Pablo Salazar Mendiguchía (born August 9, 1954), former governor of Chiapas (2000–2006) and former senator of the Republic (1994–2000), is a member of the Church of the Nazarene;
 Esther R. Sanger (1926–1995) was the founder of two nonprofit organizations: the Quincy Crisis Center, based in Quincy, Massachusetts, and the Martha–Mary Learning Center in Hingham, Massachusetts. After her death, the organization that runs both centers was named the Esther R. Sanger Center for Compassion. Known locally as the "Mother Teresa of the South Shore", she was ordained an elder in the Church of the Nazarene in 1994.
 Scottish businessman Brian Souter (born 1954 in Perth, Scotland), the prominent leader of the Keep the Clause campaign, is an active member of the denomination;
 Members of the southern gospel singing group the Speer Family (which was inducted into the Gospel Music Association Hall of Fame in 1998) have close associations with the Church of the Nazarene. Among those are Jackson Brock Speer (the oldest son of Tom and Lena Speer, the founders of the group), who was inducted into the Gospel Music Hall of Fame in 1998, who is a graduate of Trevecca Nazarene University, and is an ordained elder in the Church of the Nazarene;
 Larry Wall (born September 27, 1954), creator of the Perl computer programming language and important early contributor to the open source movement, is a member of the New Life Church of the Nazarene in Cupertino, California;
 Professional mixed martial artist and professional wrestler competing in the WWE, Shayna Baszler
 Former U.S. representative from Kansas Vince Snowbarger
 Author and historian Randall Stephens
 Aguiar Valvassoura, pastor of the Campinas Central Church of the Nazarene in Campinas, Brazil
 Pastor Joyce and Rich Swingle have taught, performed and preached in over 40 states, on six continents and in about 40 nations. Rich is a registered drama evangelist on the Metro New York District of the Church of the Nazarene, and one of the pieces the Swingles perform is based on the first Nazarene Missionaries, Harmon and Lula Schmelzenbach. 

Notable Nazarene historians include Timothy L. Smith, Stan Ingersol, Floyd T. Cunningham, Paul M. Bassett, Paul Wesley Ragland Jr (of Virginia), and Randall J. Stephens. Biblical scholars of note include Olive Winchester, Ralph Earle), and William Greathouse.

Former Nazarenes
 Four-time governor of Louisiana Edwin Edwards (1927–2021) early in life was a Nazarene preacher before converting to Roman Catholicism. (see also Edwin Edwards#Early life and career);
 American investment banker and philanthropist Abram Fitkin, (died 1933), husband of NMI founder, Susan Norris Fitkin, was a member of the John Wesley Church of the Nazarene, Brooklyn;
 American nuclear scientist Robert W. Faid (1929 – May 26, 2008) was a member of the First Church of the Nazarene, Greenville, South Carolina;
 Convicted murderer Caril Ann Fugate (born July 31, 1943), the then girlfriend of spree killer Charles Starkweather, the youngest female in United States history to be tried for first-degree murder, while imprisoned at the Nebraska Center for Women in York, Nebraska (1958–1976), "worked in a Nazarene church nursery, taught Bible classes on Sunday, and occasionally delivered sermons". In 1971 Fugate became a member of the York Church of the Nazarene, After her release from prison, Fugate relocated to St. Johns, Michigan, where she served as a volunteer at a Nazarene church in the area;
 Southern Gospel singer and songwriter Bill Gaither (born March 28, 1936), winner of five Grammy Awards and 28 Dove Awards, and a 1982 inductee to the Gospel Music Hall of Fame, grew up in a Nazarene family, and became a member of the denomination at his home church in Alexandria, Indiana. Currently he attends the Park Place Church of God in Anderson, Indiana;
 Academy Award-winning actor Tom Hanks (born July 9, 1956) attended the Church of the Nazarene while living with an aunt as a teenager;
 American politician Gary Hart (born Gary Warren Hartpence, November 28, 1936), who served as a United States Senator (1974–1980) and was a two-time candidate for president of the United States (1984, 1988), was raised as a member of the Church of the Nazarene; married Oletha Ludwig, the daughter of the General Secretary of the denomination; and also graduated from Southern Nazarene University;
 Tunney Hunsaker (September 1, 1932 – April 27, 2005), former police chief of Fayetteville, West Virginia, the first opponent of Muhammad Ali in a professional boxing bout in 1960, was a member of the Church of the Nazarene in Oak Hill, West Virginia;
 Haitian-American musician Wyclef Jean (born October 17, 1972), is the son of the late Rev. Gesner Jean (born c. 1940; died September 3, 2001), a Nazarene pastor, and was raised in the denomination, including the Good Shepherd Church of the Nazarene in Newark, New Jersey, and briefly attended Eastern Nazarene College;
 Prolific Christian author R. T. Kendall (born July 13, 1935), who pastored the Westminster Chapel for 25 years (1977–2002), was born into a Nazarene family in Ashland, Kentucky, named for general superintendent Roy T. Williams, graduated from Trevecca Nazarene University (1970), and commenced his ministry in the denomination before his Calvinistic convictions necessitated his resignation. In 2008 he was awarded an honorary doctor of divinity degree by Trevecca Nazarene University;
 American artist Thomas Kinkade (January 19, 1958 – April 6, 2012) was a member of the Church of the Nazarene;
 Norwegian Gospel Hall of Fame inductee Haldor Lillenas (November 19, 1885 – August 18, 1959), was an ordained minister in the Church of the Nazarene, author, song evangelist, poet, music publisher and prolific hymnwriter, who is estimated to have composed over 4,000 hymns;
 Grammy Award-winning American rock singer-songwriter John Mellencamp (born October 7, 1951), was raised in the Church of the Nazarene in Seymour, Indiana;
 Actor Ron Raines (born December 2, 1949), is the son of a Nazarene minister, and was active in the denomination until at least 1969.
 Actress Debbie Reynolds (April 1, 1932 – December 28, 2016), was raised within the Church of the Nazarene, attending three times a week for sixteen years;
 American Bob Pierce (1914–1978), the founder of international Christian relief and development organizations World Vision in 1950, and Samaritan's Purse (1970), was an ordained minister in the Church of the Nazarene;
 Canadian Charles Templeton (October 7, 1915 – June 7, 2001), the co-founder of Youth for Christ, was an evangelist in the Church of the Nazarene, and founder of the Avenue Road Church of the Nazarene in Toronto, Canada, before becoming an agnostic, Ontario Liberal Party politician, newspaper editor, inventor, broadcaster and author;
 Southern Gospel pioneer and music publisher James David Vaughan (1864–1941), the founder of the Vaughan Conservatory of Music (1911) and the James D. Vaughan Publishing Company (1902), who was inducted into the Southern Gospel Music Hall of Fame in 1997, became a member of the Church of the Nazarene in Lawrenceburg, Tennessee (now known as Vaughan Memorial Church of the Nazarene) in the 1920s, and brought the singing Speers Family into the denomination.
Japanese graphic designer, set designer, essayist and novelist Kappa Senoo, (1930–) grew up in a Nazarene family in Kobe, Japan before and during WWII. He recounts the conversion of his parents and his experiences in church and family life in his book A Boy Called H.

See also

 List of wealthiest religious organizations
 List of Church of the Nazarene conventions
 List of Church of the Nazarene schools
 Nazarene Hymnals
 Nazarene Missionaries

References

Further reading
 The Manual: Church of the Nazarene. Nazarene Publishing House 2013.

General
 Hill, Samuel S., ed. Encyclopedia of Religion in the South.
 Mead, Frank S., Samuel S. Hill, & Craig D. Atwood. Handbook of Denominations,
 Religious Congregations & Membership in the United States, Glenmary Research Center

Biographies
 Bangs, Carl. Phineas F. Bresee: His Life in Methodism, the Holiness Movement, and the Church of the Nazarene. Kansas City, MO: Beacon Hill Press, 1995.
 Laird, Rebecca. Ordained Women in the Church of the Nazarene: The First Generation. Kansas City, MO: Beacon Hill Press of Kansas City, 1993.

Comparative and Sociological
 Finke, Roger & Rodney Stark. The Churching of America, 1776–2005: Winners and Losers in Our Religious Economy, Revised and Expanded Edition. Rutgers University Press; Revised edition, 2005.
 Newman, William M. and Peter L. Halvorson, eds., Atlas of American Religion: The Denominational Era, 1776–1990. Rowman Altamira, 2000.
 Tracy, Wesley and Stan Ingersol. Here We Stand: Where Nazarenes Fit in the Religious Marketplace. Beacon Hill Press of Kansas City, 1999.

History
 Chapman, J.B. A History of the Church of the Nazarene. Kansas City, MO: Nazarene, 1926.
 Cunningham, Floyd T. Holiness Abroad: Nazarene Missions in Asia. Pietist and Wesleyan Studies, No. 16. Metuchen, NJ: Scarecrow Press, 2003.
 Cunningham, Floyd T., ed. Our Watchword and Song: The Centennial History of the Church of the Nazarene. Beacon Hill Press of Kansas City, 2009. 
 Parker, J. Fred. Mission to the World: A History of Missions in the Church of the Nazarene Through 1985. Kansas City, MO: Nazarene Publishing House, 1988.
 Purkiser, Westlake T. Called Unto Holiness: Volume Two: The Story of the Nazarenes: The Second Twentyfive Years, 1933–1958. Beacon Hill Press of Kansas City, 1983.
 Smith, Timothy L. Called Unto Holiness: Volume One: The Story of the Nazarenes: The Formative Years. Nazarene Publishing House, 1962.
 Thornton, Wallace Jr. Radical Righteousness: personal ethics and the development of the Holiness Movement. Schmul Publishing, 1998. 
  A brief narrated history of the Christian Church and the founding of the Church of the Nazarene.

Internationalisation
 Cook, R. Franklin. The International Dimension: Six Expressions of the Great Commission. Nazarene Publishing House, 1984.
 Ingersol, Stan. "Nazarene Odyssey and the Hinges of Internationalization". Wesleyan Theological Journal 38:1 (2003).
 Johnson, Jerald D. International Experience. Beacon Hill Press, 1982.

Theology
 Dunning, H. Ray. Grace, Faith & Holiness: A Wesleyan Systematic Theology. Kansas City, MO: Beacon Hill Press, 1988. 
 Ellyson, Edgar P. Theological Compend. Chicago, Christian Witness Co., 1908.
 Greathouse, William M. Wholeness in Christ: Toward a Biblical Theology of Holiness. Kansas City, MO: Beacon Hill Press of Kansas City, 1998.
 Grider, J. Kenneth. A Wesleyan-Holiness Theology. Beacon Hill Press, 1994. 
 Hills, A.M. Fundamental Christian Theology: A Systematic Theology. 2 vols. C.J. Kinne, 1931. Vol. 1 Vol. 2 (PDF)
 Leclerc, Diane. Discovering Christian Holiness: The Heart of Wesleyan-Holiness Theology. Kansas City, MO: Beacon Hill Press of Kansas City, 2010.
 Oord, Thomas Jay and Michael Lodahl. Relational Holiness: Responding to the Call of Love. Kansas City: Beacon Hill Press, 2005.
 Quanstrom, Mark R. A Century of Holiness Theology: The Doctrine of Entire Sanctification in the Church of the Nazarene: 1905 to 2004. Kansas City, MO: Beacon Hill Press of Kansas City, 2004.
 Taylor, Richard S. Exploring Christian Holiness, Volume 3: Theological Formulation. Kansas City, MO: Beacon Hill Press of Kansas City, 1985.
 Wiley, H. Orton. Christian Theology. 3 vols. Kansas City, MO; Beacon Hill Press, 1940, 1941, 1943.
 Wynkoop, Mildred Bangs. Foundations of Wesleyan-Arminian Theology. Kansas City, MO: Beacon Hill Press, 1972.
 Wynkoop, Mildred Bangs. A Theology of Love: The Dynamic of Wesleyanism. Kansas City, MO: Beacon Hill Press, 1972.
Quient, Nicholas Rudolph. The Perfection of Our Faithful Wills: Paul's Apocalyptic Vision of Entire Sanctification. Eugene, OR: Wipf & Stock, 2019.

External links

 
 
 Church of the Nazarene: Association of Religion Data Archives

 
Arminian denominations
Christian terminology
Members of the National Association of Evangelicals
Organizations based in Kansas City, Missouri
Holiness denominations
Religious organizations established in 1895
1895 establishments in the United States